Carex nova is a tussock-forming species of perennial sedge in the family Cyperaceae. It is native to western central parts of the United States.

See also
List of Carex species

References

nova
Taxa named by Liberty Hyde Bailey
Plants described in 1888
Flora of Wyoming
Flora of Utah
Flora of Colorado
Flora of Nevada
Flora of New Mexico